Tarak Bandyopadhyay ( – 10 October 2013) was an Indian politician from West Bengal belonging to All India Trinamool Congress. He was a member of the West Bengal Legislative Assembly.

Biography
Bandyopadhyay was elected as a legislator of the West Bengal Legislative Assembly as an Indian National Congress candidate from  Cossipur in 1996. Later, he joined Trinamool Congress. He was elected as a legislator of the West Bengal Legislative Assembly as a Trinamool Congress candidate from Cossipur in 2001 and 2006.

Bandyopadhyay died of cardiac arrest on 10 October 2013 at the age of 70.

References

1940s births
2013 deaths
Indian National Congress politicians from West Bengal
Trinamool Congress politicians from West Bengal
Politicians from Kolkata
West Bengal MLAs 1996–2001
West Bengal MLAs 2001–2006
West Bengal MLAs 2006–2011